Bonanza Air Lines was an airline (known at the time as a "local service" air carrier as defined by the federal Civil Aeronautics Board) in the Western United States (and eventually Mexico) from 1945 until it merged with two other local service airlines to form Air West in 1968. Its headquarters was initially Las Vegas, Nevada, and moved to Phoenix, Arizona in 1966.

The airline began scheduled flights in 1945 with a twin engine Cessna between Nevada cities Las Vegas, Reno, Tonopah and Hawthorne. In the 1950s and early 1960s the airline expanded into Arizona, Southern California and Utah, including Phoenix, Los Angeles and Salt Lake City. Until 1978 Bonanza had the only scheduled nonstop flights between Las Vegas and Reno. It became an international airline soon before it merged with Pacific Air Lines and West Coast Airlines to form Air West, with Douglas DC-9s from Phoenix and Tucson to La Paz, Mazatlán and Puerto Vallarta.  Air West would later be renamed Hughes Airwest. Hughes Airwest was bought out by Republic Airlines (1979–1986) in 1980. In 1986 Republic was merged into Northwest Airlines. In 2010 Northwest merged into Delta Air Lines.

History 

The company began operations in 1945 and was based in Las Vegas.  It was known as Bonanza Air Services in Las Vegas.  Bonanza was part of a Civil Aeronautics Board (CAB) effort to develop "local service airlines." Interstate flights started in December 1949 and Bonanza's flight schedules appeared in the Official Airline Guide.

In October 1951, its Douglas DC-3s served eight airports from Reno to Phoenix. By July 1952 Bonanza added seven airports west from Phoenix to Los Angeles. In 1968 it began flights to Mexico from Tucson, and by that May the airline scheduled flights to 22 airports.

Like other local service air carriers, Bonanza was subsidized by the federal government.  In 1962 its operating revenues of $11.0 million included $3.2 million "Pub. serv. rev."

In 1959, Bonanza introduced Fairchild F-27s and unsuccessfully applied for routes to Texas. The F-27 was a U.S. built version of the Dutch built Fokker F27 Friendship. The last scheduled DC-3 flight was in late 1960, and Bonanza became the first all-turbine airline in the U.S. Bonanza F-27s flew to Grand Canyon National Park Airport (GCN) in northern Arizona with flights to Las Vegas, Phoenix, Salt Lake City and Tucson.

Bonanza ordered three BAC One-Elevens in October 1962; this request was denied by the federal Civil Aeronautics Board (CAB), although U.S. authorities allowed American Airlines, Braniff International Airways, Aloha Airlines and Mohawk Airlines to purchase the same aircraft. An order was then placed for the U.S. built equivalent, the Douglas DC-9 series 10.  Deliveries of the DC-9 began in late 1965 and flights commenced on March 1, 1966. The DC-9s, dubbed Funjets, flew the following routes in the first year: Las Vegas—Reno, Las Vegas—Los Angeles, Reno—Los Angeles, Salt Lake City—Phoenix, and Reno—Las Vegas—Phoenix. The headquarters moved to Phoenix during 1966.

Bonanza's April 28, 1968, timetable listed DC-9 flights on the following:

 Las Vegas - Los Angeles
 Las Vegas - Phoenix
 Las Vegas - Orange County Airport (now John Wayne Airport)
 Las Vegas - Reno
 Las Vegas - Tucson
 Los Angeles - Las Vegas - Reno
 Los Angeles - Tucson - Phoenix
 Los Angeles - San Diego - Tucson
 Phoenix - Las Vegas - Reno
 Phoenix - Orange County Airport
 Phoenix - Tucson - La Paz - Mazatlan - Puerto Vallarta
 Salt Lake City - Phoenix - Tucson
 Reno - Las Vegas - Phoenix - Tucson

With Civil Aeronautics Board approval on April 17, 1968 Bonanza Air Lines merged with Pacific Air Lines and West Coast Airlines to form Air West on July 1. Bonanza's DC-9-10s and F-27As joined the new Air West fleet. Air West would be renamed Hughes Airwest in 1970 and would be acquired in 1980 by Republic Airlines (the result of the 1979 merger of North Central Airlines and Southern Airways), with Republic being acquired by Northwest Airlines in 1986.  Northwest merged with Delta Air Lines in 2008.

A McDonnell Douglas DC-9-31 (construction number 47246/registration N9333) was ordered by Bonanza but was delivered to Air West after the merger. It flew with Bonanza's successors until about 2009.

Fleet 
 Cessna T-50
 Douglas DC-3 (including C-47)
 Douglas DC-9-10 (series -11, -14 and -15)
 Fairchild F-27A
 Grumman Gulfstream I (model G-159)
 McDonnell Douglas DC-9-30 (stretched series -31 model ordered by Bonanza and delivered new to Air West after the merger)

Destinations in 1968 
The Bonanza route map in their April 28, 1968 timetable lists the following destinations. Cities in bold were served with DC-9 jets and F-27 turboprops or only by DC-9s while other destinations were served only by F-27s:

 Blythe, California (BLH)
 Cedar City, Utah (CDC)
 El Centro, California (IPL)
 Grand Canyon, Arizona (GCN) 
 Kingman, Arizona (IGM)
 La Paz, Mexico (LAP)
 Las Vegas, Nevada (LAS)
 Los Angeles, California (LAX)
 Mazatlan, Mexico (MZT) 
 Ontario, California (ONT)
 Orange County, California (SNA)
 Page, Arizona (PGA)
 Palm Springs, California (PSP)
 Phoenix Arizona (PHX)
 Prescott, Arizona (PRC)
 Puerto Vallarta, Mexico (PVR)
 Reno, Nevada (RNO) (Lake Tahoe was served via Reno)
 Riverside, California (RAL)
 Salt Lake City, Utah (SLC)
 San Diego, California (SAN)
 Tucson, Arizona (TUS)
 Yuma, Arizona (YUM) 

Guaymas, Mexico (GYM) is shown on this map; however, Bonanza was not serving Guaymas at this time although it had the authority to do so. Earlier in 1968, the airline served Apple Valley, California (APV) with F-27s.

Incidents and accidents 
The airline's only fatal incident was on November 15, 1964, when Bonanza Air Lines Flight 114, flying from Phoenix, Arizona to Las Vegas, Nevada, crashed into a mountain south of Las Vegas during poor weather.  There were no survivors among the 26 passengers and three crew on board the F-27.

See also 
 List of defunct airlines of the United States

References

External links

Bonanza Airlines Historical Website - bonanzaairlines.com
Timetableimages.com has Bonanza timetables from 1951–1968, showing where they flew and what it cost.
Photographs of Bonanza Air Lines planes - airliners.net
Bonanza Air Lines timetable cover, showing Nevada destinations in February 1948 - airtimes.com
Gallery of Bonanza Air Lines timetable covers from the 1950s - airtimes.com
Gallery of Bonanza Air Lines postcards - williamdemarest.com
historical notes, route summations, marketing materials, and aircraft images of Bonanza Air Lines - airlinecolors.com
Bonanza Air Lines records - lists artifact collection stored at the Minnesota Historical Society

 
Defunct regional airlines of the United States
Companies based in the Las Vegas Valley
Companies based in Phoenix, Arizona
Airlines established in 1945
Airlines disestablished in 1968
Defunct companies based in Arizona
Defunct companies based in Nevada
1945 establishments in Nevada
1968 disestablishments in Arizona
American companies established in 1945
American companies disestablished in 1968
Defunct airlines of the United States
Airlines based in Nevada